"Tick-Tock" is a song by Croatian singer Albina. The song represented Croatia in the Eurovision Song Contest 2021 in Rotterdam after winning the pre-selection competition Dora 2021, but failed to qualify for the Grand Final, placing 11th in the Semi-final.

Background and release
"Tick-Tock" was one of fourteen songs commissioned by HRT for Dora 2021, Croatia's national selection for the Eurovision Song Contest 2021. The song was composed by Branimir Mihaljević with Max Cinnamon providing the English language lyrics and Tihana Buklijaš Bakić writing the Croatian language lyrics. "Tick-Tock" premiered on 13 February 2021, when it was performed in Dora 2021, Croatia's national selection for the Eurovision Song Contest 2021. The song became available through digital retailers and streaming services on the same day through Universal Music Croatia.

At Eurovision

National selection
HRT allowed artists and composers to submit their entries for Dora 2021 between 26 October 2020 and 10 December 2020 for the selection of their entry for the Eurovision Song Contest 2021. On 15 December 2020, Albina was announced as one of the fourteen participants in Dora 2021 with the song "Tick-Tock". In the final, held on 13 February 2021, she won the televote and jury vote, placing first with 198 points and thus earned the right to represent Croatia at the Eurovision Song Contest 2021.

In Rotterdam 
The song was performed in Ahoy during the first semi-final on 18 May 2021 but did not qualify for the final. Doing so it became the first non-qualifier in Eurovision history to place in the top 10 with both televote and juries without making it to the final.

Commercial performance
"Tick Tock" debuted atop the HR Top 40 chart, giving Grčić her first number-one single in Croatia.  It marked her second entry on the chart, after "Imuna na strah". "Tick Tock" also debuted atop of all five regional charts of the HR Top 40.

Track listing

Charts

Release history

References

2021 songs
2021 singles
Eurovision songs of 2021
Eurovision songs of Croatia
Universal Music Group singles
English-language Croatian songs